The Old Quebec Funicular is a funicular railway in the Old Quebec neighbourhood of Quebec City, Quebec, Canada. It links the Haute-Ville (Upper Town) at Dufferin Terrace to the Basse-Ville (Lower Town) at Rue du Petit-Champlain. The Basse-Ville includes such sites as the colonial-era Notre Dame des Victoires church, the historic Petit Champlain district, the port, and the Musée de la civilisation (Museum of Civilization).

History 
The funicular opened on November 17, 1879, and it originally used the water ballast system of propulsion. The line was converted to electrical operation in 1907. On July 2, 1945, a major fire destroyed the structure, necessitating a rebuild that was completed in 1946. Since then, major renovations have taken place in 1978 and 1998. In 2004, it celebrated 125 years of operating.

In October 1996, Briton Helen Tombs was killed when the cable snapped and the emergency brake failed to stop the cabin before it crashed into the lower station. As a result of this fatal crash, the funicular was closed and entirely revamped with modern technology. It reopened in 1998, technically as an inclined elevator, since both cabins are independent.

The funicular has the following technical parameters:

Length: 
Height: 
Cars: 2
Configuration: Double track
Traction: Electricity

See also 
 List of funicular railways

References

External links
The Old Quebec Funicular (in English)

Funicular railways in Canada
Transport in Quebec City
Quebec railways
Tourist attractions in Quebec City
Former water-powered funicular railways converted to electricity
Railway lines opened in 1879
Old Quebec